B.B. King "Into the Night" is a 1985 documentary film directed by Jeff A. Okun and co-directed by John Landis for Universal Pictures; it was produced by Leslie Belzberg, John Landis and George Folsey Jr.

Synopsis
Landis directed the parts of the film that are the music videos for B.B. King's songs "Lucille", "Into the Night" (specially composed by Ira Newborn for the film Into the Night) and also for the song "In the Midnight Hour". Videos for "Lucille" and "In the Midnight Hour" are similar and show B.B. King and his band (Jeff Goldblum, Michelle Pfeiffer, Dan Aykroyd, Eddie Murphy and Steve Martin) during a performance in a 1980s nightclub. The video made for "Into the Night" took place in a television studio and shows B.B. King with Jeff Goldblum. Jeff Okun directed the rest of the film (including editing archival King's footage and interviews with Landis and King). The film was made to promote Into the Night and as a tribute to B.B. King's life and art.

DVD
B.B. King "Into the Night" appears on the Into the Night movie DVD as a special feature.

External links

1985 films
Documentary films about blues music and musicians
American documentary films
1985 documentary films
Films directed by John Landis
Films produced by John Landis
Films produced by George Folsey Jr.
1980s English-language films
1980s American films